Deudorix magda, the dusky playboy, is a butterfly in the family Lycaenidae. It is found in Malawi, Zambia and northern and eastern Zimbabwe. The habitat consists of Brachystegia-Uapaca woodland.

Adults are attracted to flowers, including Mesembryanthemum.

The larvae feed on Uapaca kirkiana.

References

Butterflies described in 1963
Deudorigini
Deudorix